Víctor Córdoba (born March 15, 1962) is a Panamanian former professional boxer who competed from 1981 to 1999. Known as "Toby", Córdoba had a successful career and captured a world title.

Professional career

He turned pro in 1981 and captured the Lineal and WBA super middleweight titles from Christophe Tiozzo in 1991. He defended the title once against Vincenzo Nardiello before losing the belt the same year to Michael Nunn by split decision. In the rematch the following year, Córdoba lost again.

Professional boxing record

See also
List of super-middleweight boxing champions

References

External links

Víctor Córdoba - CBZ Profile

1962 births
Living people
Middleweight boxers
Super-middleweight boxers
Light-heavyweight boxers
World super-middleweight boxing champions
World Boxing Association champions
Panamanian male boxers